The 1987 USC Trojans football team represented the University of Southern California (USC) in the 1987 NCAA Division I-A football season. In their first year under head coach Larry Smith, the Trojans compiled an 8–4 record (7–1 against conference opponents), won the Pacific-10 Conference (Pac-10) championship, and outscored their opponents by a combined total of 321 to 229.

The Trojans lost their inaugural game of Larry Smith's tenure to Michigan State in the first night game ever played at Spartan Stadium.  USC secured a Rose Bowl berth by tying UCLA for the Pacific-10 championship and winning the head-to-head match. They faced Michigan State again, and lost 17–20.

Quarterback Rodney Peete led the team in passing, completing 197 of 332 passes for 2,709 yards with 21 touchdowns and 12 interceptions.  Steven Webster led the team in rushing with 239 carries for 1,109 yards and six touchdowns. Erik Affholter led the team in receiving yards with 44 catches for 640 yards and four touchdowns.

Schedule

Roster

Rankings

Game summaries

Arizona

UCLA

USC clinches berth in the Rose Bowl with the win.

References

USC
USC Trojans football seasons
Pac-12 Conference football champion seasons
USC Trojans football